Year 1514 (MDXIV) was a common year starting on Sunday (link will display the full calendar) of the Julian calendar.

Events 

 January–June 
 January 10 – A great fire breaks out, in the Rialto of Venice.
 March 12 – A huge exotic embassy sent by King Manuel I of Portugal to Pope Leo X arrives in Rome, including Hanno, an Indian elephant.
 March – Louis XII of France makes peace with Maximilian I, Holy Roman Emperor.
 May 2 – The Poor Conrad peasant revolt against Ulrich, Duke of Württemberg begins in Beutelsbach.
 May 15 – The earliest printed edition of Saxo Grammaticus' 12th century Scandinavian history Gesta Danorum, edited by Christiern Pedersen from an original found near Lund, is published as Danorum Regum heroumque Historiae, by Jodocus Badius in Paris.
 June 13 – Henry Grace à Dieu, at over 1,000 tons the largest warship in the world at this time, built at the new Woolwich Dockyard in England, is dedicated.
 June – Battle of Hornshole in the Scottish Borders: Young men from Hawick defeat a raiding party from England.

 July–December 
 July 20 – King Christian II is crowned King of Norway in Oslo. This coronation was the last in Norway for 304 years when King Charles III John was crowned king in 1818.
 August 7 – King Henry VIII of England concludes an independent peace treaty with France in the War of the League of Cambrai, negotiated by Thomas Wolsey.
 August 23 – Battle of Chaldiran: Selim I crushes the Persian army of Shah Ismail I. 
 September 8 – Battle of Orsha: In one of the biggest battles of the century, Jagiellonian dynasty forces comprising Belarusians of the Grand Duchy of Lithuania and Poles defeat the army of the Grand Duchy of Moscow.
 September 15 – Thomas Wolsey is appointed Archbishop of York in England.
 October 9 – Louis XII of France marries Mary Tudor (sister of King Henry VIII of England) at Abbeville, as part of the English peace with France.

 Date unknown 
 Albrecht Dürer makes his famous engraving Melencolia I.
 Paolo Ricci (Camillo Renato) moves to Augsburg.
 Nicolaus Copernicus's Commentariolus, outlining his theory of heliocentrism, is written by this date.

Births 

 January 1 – George Gordon, 4th Earl of Huntly, Scottish noble (d. 1562)
 January 23 – Hai Rui, Chinese official of the Ming Dynasty (d. 1587)
 January 27 – Bernardino Maffei, Italian Catholic cardinal (d. 1553)
 February 8 – Daniele Barbaro, Venetian churchman, diplomat and scholar (d. 1570)
 February 10 – Domenico Bollani, Bishop of Milan (d. 1579)
 February 16 – Georg Joachim Rheticus, Austrian cartographer and scientific instrument maker (d. 1574)
 February 22 – Tahmasp I, Shah of Iran (d. 1576)
 February 22 – Johannes Gigas, German theologian (d. 1581)
 February 26 – Otto Truchsess von Waldburg, German Catholic cardinal (d. 1573)
 March 8 – Amago Haruhisa, Japanese samurai and warlord (d. 1561)
 March 23 – Lorenzino de' Medici, Italian writer and assassin (d. 1548)
 April 2 – Guidobaldo II della Rovere, Duke of Urbino, Italian condottiero (d. 1574)
 April 5 – Joachim Mörlin, German bishop (d. 1571)
 April 30 – Alexander Stewart, Duke of Ross, Scottish prince (d. 1515)
 May 28 – Shimazu Takahisa, daimyō and fifteenth head of the Shimazu clan (d. 1571)
 June 16 – John Cheke, English classical scholar and statesman (d. 1557)
 August 29 – García Álvarez de Toledo, 4th Marquis of Villafranca, Spanish noble and admiral (d. 1577)
 September 12 – Philip, Duke of Mecklenburg, (d. 1557)
 September 20 – Philipp IV, Count of Hanau-Lichtenberg (d. 1590)
 September 24 – Prospero Santacroce, Italian Roman Catholic cardinal (d. 1589)
 October 7 – Queen Inseong, Korean royal consort (d. 1578)
 October 31 – Wolfgang Lazius, Austrian historian (d. 1565)
 November 29 – Andreas Musculus, German theologian (d. 1581)
 November 30 – Andreas Masius, German Catholic priest (d. 1573)
 December 31 –  Andreas Vesalius, Flemish anatomist (d. 1564)
 date unknown
 Hosokawa Harumoto, Japanese military leader (d. 1563)
 George Gordon, 4th Earl of Huntly, Scottish nobleman (d. 1562)
 Charles de Mornay, Swedish (originally French) court official, diplomat and royal favorite (d. 1574) 
 John Knox, Scottish clergyman, theologian and writer (d. 1572)
 Barbara Uthmann, German businessperson (d. 1575)

Deaths 

 January 2 – William Smyth, English bishop and statesman (b. 1460)
 January 9 – Anne of Brittany, queen of Charles VIII of France and Louis XII of France (b. 1477)
 March 11 – Donato Bramante, Italian architect (b. 1444)
 April 21 – Ichijō Fuyuyoshi, Japanese court noble (b. 1465)
 May 3 – Anna of Brandenburg, Duchess consort of Schleswig and Holstein (b. 1487)
 June 23 – Henry IV, Duke of Brunswick-Lüneburg (b. 1463)
 June 25 – Zuster Bertken Dutch anchorite (b. 1426)
 July 20 – György Dózsa, Transylvanian peasant revolt leader (b. 1470)
 October 21 – Alexander, Count Palatine of Zweibrücken and Count of Veldenz (1489–1514) (b. 1462)
 October 25 – William Elphinstone, Scottish bishop and statesman (b. 1431)
 November 28 – Hartmann Schedel, German cartographer (b. 1440)
 December – Henry, Duke of Cornwall, third son of Henry VIII of England (stillborn)
date unknown
 Agnes Fingerin, German philanthropist and businessperson

References